.am is the Internet country code top-level domain (ccTLD) for Armenia.

Regulation 
The registry for .am is operated by ISOC-AM,  the local chapter of the Internet Society.

Regulatory notes:
 Any person in the world can register a .am, .com.am, .net.am, .org.am domain for a fee.
 Each domain name is subject to review. Generally, each review takes about 2 or 3 working days.
 Armenian law prohibits its domain names from being used for spam, pornography, or terrorism sites.
 The AM-NIC was moved over to IPv6 address compatibility in line with the global DNS.
 Unicode compatible names will not be instituted at AM-NIC until all issues related to IPv6 are resolved.

Usage in domain hacks 
Domains within the .am ccTLD enjoy popularity due to the connection to AM radio (similar to the .fm and .tv ccTLDs), and the ability to form English words ending in "am" — e.g. the mobile photo sharing service Instagram uses the Armenian domain name Instagr.am. The live video streaming service Stre.am uses the TLD to form their operative keyword, "Stream".  American music artist and producer will.i.am uses the domain for his website. Such unconventional usage of TLDs in domain names are called domain hacks.

Second top-level domain

In 2014 a new Armenian top-level domain name was added, intended for Armenian language domain names. The TLD is .հայ (“hy”), from the ethnonym for Armenian. It launched in 2016.

References

External links
 IANA .am whois information
 Armenia Network Information Centre
 List of .AM registrars
 .AM accredited registrar
 .AM accredited registrar, .AM domain marketplace

Internet in Armenia
Mass media in Armenia
Country code top-level domains
Council of European National Top Level Domain Registries members
Computer-related introductions in 1994

sv:Toppdomän#A